Gary Hayes (born August 19, 1957) is a former defensive back in the National Football League. He played three seasons with the Green Bay Packers. Previously, he played three seasons in the Canadian Football League with the Edmonton Eskimos, winning two Grey Cup championships with them in 1981 and 1982.

References

Green Bay Packers players
Edmonton Elks players
American football defensive backs
Canadian football defensive backs
American players of Canadian football
Fresno State Bulldogs football players
1957 births
Living people
Players of American football from Tucson, Arizona